Crane Eater Creek is a stream in Gordon County, Georgia, United States, that is a tributary of the Coosawattee River.

Crane Eater Creek has the name of a Cherokee man who settled near its course.

See also

 List of rivers in Georgia (U.S. state)

References

Rivers of Georgia (U.S. state)
Rivers of Gordon County, Georgia